Khudushny is a rural locality (a khutor) in Kalashnikovskoye Rural Settlement, Pallasovsky District, Volgograd Oblast, Russia. The population was 139 as of 2010. There are 5 streets.

Geography 
Khudushny is located in steppe, on the Caspian Depression, 19 km southwest of Pallasovka (the district's administrative centre) by road. Kalashniki is the nearest rural locality.

References 

Rural localities in Pallasovsky District